Barbara Kolb (born February 10, 1939) is an American composer. Her music uses sound masses and often creates vertical structures through simultaneous rhythmic or melodic units (motifs or figures). Kolb's musical style can be identified by her use of colorful textures, impressionistic touch, and atonal vocabulary, with influences stemming from literary and visual arts. She was the first American woman composer to win the Rome Prize.

Life and music
Kolb was born in Hartford, Connecticut. She received her B.M. (cum laude, 1961) and M.M. degrees (1964) from the Hartt College of Music (now The Hartt School) at the University of Hartford, where she studied with Arnold Franchetti, Lukas Foss and Gunther Schuller. Following her graduation, Kolb relocated to Vienna, Austria, from 1966 to 1967 with a Fulbright Fellowship grant. She was the first female American composer to win the Rome Prize [Prix de Rome], in 1969. From 1979 to 1982, Kolb served as the artistic director of contemporary music at the Third Street Music School Settlement, where she presented the "Music New to New York" concert series. Additionally, she has had a professional teaching career teaching at Rhode Island College and Eastman School of Music as a visiting professor in composition. A selection of Kolb's compositions were featured at the Kennedy Center, performed by the "Theatre Chamber Players" as part of the Boston Modern Orchestra Project. However, Kolb was not only known as a composer; she was also proficient at the clarinet.

Her compositions include All in Good Time (1993), commissioned for the 150th Anniversary of the New York Philharmonic, and Voyants (1991), a concerto for piano and chamber orchestra dedicated to the memory of Aaron Copland. Voyants was most recently performed by Kathleen Supové with the Rhode Island College Symphony Orchestra under the direction of Dr. Edward Markward on October 16, 2006 in Providence, RI. Discs devoted solely to Kolb's music have been released to the general public by CRI and New World Records. Her orchestral composition All in Good Time was recorded by the Grant Park Symphony Orchestra, under the direction of Carlos Kalmar, along with works by John Corigliano, Aaron Jay Kernis, John Harbison and Michael Hersch on a CD released by Cedille Records in the summer of 2006. Her music is published exclusively by Boosey and Hawkes.

Selected compositions
 Millefoglie, for chamber orchestra and computer generated tape
 Extremes, duo for flute and cello
 Chromatic Fantasy, for narrator and six instruments
 Solitaire, for piano and two-channel tape and vibraphone
 Looking for Claudio for solo guitar and tape (1975)
 Cavatina for violin or viola solo (1983, revised 1985)
 Related Characters for viola and piano (1982)
 Umbrian Colors for violin and guitar (1986)
 Virgin Mother Creatrix a cappella choral work inspired by the mysticism of Hildegard von Bingen

Discography
All Barbara Kolb discs

 Barbara Kolb: Millefoglie and Other Works (1992). Music Today and Nouvel Ensemble Moderne. Includes Kolb's Millefoglie for orchestra & tape (1985), Extremes for cello & flute (1989), Chromatic Fantasy for narrator and six instruments (1979), and Solitaire for piano and pre-recorded tape (1971) (New World Records 80422-2).
 Barbara Kolb: Soundings and Other Works (1990). Ensemble InterContemporain conducted by Arthur Tamayo; Igor Kipnis, harpsichord; Jay Gottlieb, piano, etc.; includes Kolb's Soundings (1971–72), Toccata (1971), Apello (1976), Looking for Claudio (1975), and Spring River Flowers Moon Night (1974–75) (Composers Recordings Inc. CD 576, available from New World Records).

Others

Related Characters – featuring Bill Perconti, James March, and Iowa Brass Quintet – includes Kolb's Related Characters for alto saxophone and piano (1982) (Centaur).
American Orchestra Works – featuring the Grant Park Orchestra conducted by Carlos Kalmar – includes Kolb's All in Good Time (1993) (Cedille).

Bibliography
 Julie C. Dunbar: Women, Music, Culture. An introduction (London: Routledge, 2011).

References

External links
Barbara Kolb's page on the American Music Center's Online Library
Barbara Kolb's page on the Boosey & Hawkes website
Barbara Kolb's page on the Boston Modern Orchestra Project website
A short essay written by Barbara Kolb in response to the question, "When did first you know that you would be a composer and what is the earliest work that you still acknowledge?" from July 2001, published on NewMusicBox

1939 births
20th-century American composers
20th-century American women musicians
20th-century classical composers
20th-century women composers
21st-century American composers
21st-century American women musicians
21st-century classical composers
21st-century women composers
American classical composers
American women classical composers
American women in electronic music
Living people
Musicians from Hartford, Connecticut
University of Hartford Hartt School alumni